Jennifer Down (born 1990) is an Australian novelist and short story writer. She won the 2022 Miles Franklin Award for her novel Bodies of Light.

Biography  
Down was in born 1990.
She studied arts at Melbourne University before studying professional writing and editing at RMIT.

Down has worked as a writer, editor, and a translator.

Awards and recognition 
Down won the 2014 Elizabeth Jolley Short Story Prize for "Aokigahara" and received third prize in The Age Short Story Award for "A Ticket to Switzerland" in 2010.

Down's first novel, Our Magic Hour, was shortlisted for the 2014 Victorian Premier's Unpublished Manuscript Award. She was chosen as one of The Sydney Morning Herald  Best Young Australian Novelists in 2017 for Pulse Points and 2018 for Bodies of Light. She won the Steele Rudd Award for Pulse Points at the Queensland Literary Awards in 2018.

Her 2021 novel, Bodies of Light, won the 2022 Miles Franklin Award and was shortlisted for the 2022 Victorian Premier's Prize for Fiction, the 2022 Stella Prize, the 2022 fiction Age Book of the Year, the 2022 Barbara Jefferis Award and the 2022 Voss Literary Prize.

Works

References

External links 

 
 At home with Jennifer Down, The Garret podcast and transcript

1990 births
Living people
21st-century Australian women writers
Miles Franklin Award winners
Australian women novelists